The Philippine five hundred-peso note (Filipino: Limandaang Piso) (₱500) is a denomination of Philippine currency. Senator Benigno Aquino Jr. and his wife, President Corazon Aquino are currently featured on the front side of the note, while the Puerto Princesa Subterranean River National Park and the blue-naped parrot are featured on the reverse side. BSP will issue the polymer version of this denomination by 2023 and will be the second denomination in this format after the 1000-Piso polymer banknote issued last April 2022.

History

Pre-independence 
 1905: Philippine Islands Silver Certificates issued with a portrait of Miguel López de Legazpi.
 1918: Philippine Treasury Certificates issued with a portrait of Miguel López de Legazpi.
 1936: Philippine Commonwealth Treasury Certificates issued with a portrait of Miguel López de Legazpi. This series were later overprinted with the word "VICTORY" after the liberation of the Philippines under Japanese rule in 1944.
 1944: Japanese government issued series. Due to hyperinflation caused by the ongoing World War II, the Japanese were forced to issue higher denominations of their fiat peso. The banknotes ceased to be legal tender after the liberation.

 1949: Philippine five hundred peso bill VICTORY at Central Bank of the Philippines Banknotes

Version history

Independence

English series (1951) 
From 1953, the obverse side of the denomination featured the portrait of Manuel A. Roxas, the first president of the independent Republic of the Philippines. The reverse side featured the Old Central Bank main office. Roxas and the Central Bank building were later featured on the one hundred peso note upon the introduction of the Pilipino series notes.

In 1959, the 200 and 500 peso notes were withdrawn from circulation on December 31, 1959, pursuant to Philippine Republic Act No. 1516.

New Design series (1987–2013) 
In 1987, the five hundred peso denomination was not included in the Pilipino and Ang Bagong Lipunan series. The denomination however was reintroduced on August 21, 1987, as part of the New Design series notes.

The note features the portrait of Benigno Aquino Jr., a former senator and an opposition leader when Ferdinand Marcos was president. The note is predominantly yellow in color. The obverse also features two popular quotes from Aquino: "Faith in our people and faith in God" (which is situated above the signature of the President of the Philippines), and "The Filipino is worth dying for", under which is signed his nickname, "Ninoy". There is also the signature of Aquino, a typewriter with his initials ("B.S.A.J."), and a dove of peace. The reverse features a collage of various images in relation to Aquino, showing him, inter alia, as a journalist for the Manila Times in front of an article about "1st Cav", a senator (the pioneer of the Study Now, Pay Later education program), the mayor of his hometown of Concepcion, the governor of Tarlac, and as the main driving force behind the People Power Revolution of 1986, some three years after his death in 1983. This is the only note where the name is written in script. The banknote was designed by Rafael Asuncion.

After the creation of the "Bangko Sentral ng Pilipinas" in 1993, its new logo was incorporated on all the New Design series bills.

In 1998, the year of printing was added at the bottom of the denomination value located at the upper left corner of the obverse. The names of the signatories on the bills were later added starting with banknotes featuring the signature of President Joseph Estrada.

In 2001, additional security features were added, such as the security thread on the right side and the gold fluorescent printing on the left side across the portrait.

New Generation series (2010–present) 
From 2010 onwards, the portrait of Benigno Aquino Jr. was redesigned and a portrait of his wife, former president Corazon Aquino, was added. A scene from the EDSA Revolution was added on the lower left of the obverse and the Ninoy Aquino Monument was added in the lower middle. The reverse now features the Puerto Princesa Subterranean River National Park and the blue-naped parrot.

In 2017, an updated version of the New Generation series 500 peso banknote was issued with changes in the font size of the year of issue and the italicization of the scientific name on the reverse side.

In 2020, an enhanced version of the 500 peso banknote was released. It added color-changing indigenous patterns to the security threads. A Rolling bar effect was also added in the 500 located at the upper-left corner. Finally, eight tactile marks were placed for the elderly and the visually impaired, four tactile marks were placed on the extreme left and right side of the front of the note.

The new BSP logo, which was redesigned in January 2021 was adopted in all NGC banknotes starting with the 2022 issued banknotes featuring the signatures of President Ferdinand Marcos Jr. and BSP Governor Felipe Medalla.

Polymer version 
The Bangko Sentral ng Pilipinas (BSP) will circulate the second polymer banknote, the 500-Piso banknotes by next year after assessing the public’s acceptance of the first 1,000-Piso polymer money. However, BSP Governor Felipe Medalla said over the weekend that the 500-Piso polymer banknote is unlikely to be issued in the first half of 2023.

Version history

Unused designs

Originally, the ₱500 New Design Series banknote was to feature a portrait of Ferdinand Marcos on the obverse with the Batasang Pambansa Complex depicted on the reverse. The concept design of these bills were commissioned to Romeo Mananquil. Before this denomination was distributed, Marcos was ousted in the 1986 People Power Revolution.

In 2012, a copy of the Marcos ₱500 banknote was discovered in the collection of Wilson Yuloque, which was posted in the blog of Philippine banknote collector Christopher N.C. Gibbs. A prototype copy of the banknote is currently displayed at the Museo ng Bangko Sentral ng Pilipinas.

500-Piso Marcos Banknote (unused)

Commemorative issues
The 500-peso bill has sometimes been overprinted to commemorate certain events.

60 years of Central Banking Commemorative Banknote 
On July 9, 2009, the Bangko Sentral ng Pilipinas introduced 12 million banknotes (2 million banknotes for each denomination) with an overprint commemorating 60 years of central banking. The overprint appears on the watermark area on all six circulating denominations.

45th Annual Meeting of the Asian Development Bank (May 2–5, 2012) Commemorative Banknote 
A total of 10 million banknotes with the commemorative overprint were released by the Bangko Sentral ng Pilipinas to the general public to commemorate the Asian Development Bank's recent meetings.

Printing years

References 

Banknotes of the Philippines
Five-hundred-base-unit banknotes